L'Éclair was the first car in the world to participate in a motor race with pneumatic tyres. It was built by the brothers Michelin in 1895. It participated in the Paris-Bordeaux-Paris race, with number 46.

References

External links

Auto races in France
1895 in sports
1895 in French motorsport